Winds of War is the second album by German speed metal band Iron Angel, released in June 1986. It was the band's last album until the 2018 release of Hellbound.

Track listing

The 2004 and 2014 re-issues contains a live recorded performance from Warpke, Germany on 20 July 1985 during the Hellish Crossfire tour

Personnel
Dirk Schröder – vocals 
Peter Wittke – guitars 
Sven Strüven – guitars 
Thorsten Lohmann – bass 
Mike Matthes – drums

Additional musician
Jürgen Blackmore – guitars on "Sea of Flames"

Production
Kalle Trapp – production
Uwe Ziegler – engineering
Sidney Sohn – remastering
Tatiana Lima – executive producer

References

1986 albums
Iron Angel albums
SPV/Steamhammer albums